Walter Arthur Reek (26 January 1878 – 12/19 May 1933), was a social democrat  politician in Germany and the Free City of Danzig. He was a member of the Weimar National Assembly, the Danzig Volkstag parliament and mayor of Neuteich (Nowy Staw).

Reek was born in Danzig, West Prussia, German Empire (Gdańsk, Poland), and attended the St. Katharinen school in Danzig. He was trained as a carpenter and spent his journeyman years from 1895 to 1900 in Germany, Switzerland and Austria. From 1900 to 1902 he served in the Prussian Army and became the chairman of the Central Federation of carpenters in Danzig in 1902.

During World War I Reek initially served in the German army but started to work in several positions in the Kriegsernährungsamt in Danzig in 1916. In 1917 he headed the press commission of the socialdemocratic Volkswacht newspaper in Danzig. In 1918 he was elected to the town council of Danzig and on 19 January 1919 as a member of the Weimar National Assembly, he lost his seat after Danzig became a Free City according to the Treaty of Versailles.

Since 1919 Reek worked as Secretary of the Allgemeiner Deutscher Gewerkschaftsbund in Danzig. In 1925 he was elected the mayor of Neuteich and in 1925/1926 he was an honorary Senator in Heinrich Sahm's Danzig Senate. From 1928 on he served as Senator in the Senate of Danzig again.

The circumstances of Reek's death are reported in divergent versions. He either died from a stroke or was killed in SA "Schutzhaft" on 12 or 19 May 1933.

His name is remembered at the Memorial to the Murdered Members of the Reichstag in Berlin.

References

1878 births
1933 deaths
Members of the Volkstag of the Free City of Danzig
People from West Prussia
Social Democratic Party of Germany politicians
Members of the Weimar National Assembly
Free City of Danzig politicians